Mangelia taeniata, common name the filleted mangelia, is a species of sea snail, a marine gastropod mollusk in the family Mangeliidae.

Subspecies
 Mangelia taeniata major É.A.A. Locard & E. Caziot, 1900
 Mangelia taeniata nivea (J.E. Cooper & H.B. Preston, 1910)

Description
The length of the shell varies between 4 mm and 7 mm.

The smooth, oblong fusiform shell has shouldered whorls. It is longitudinally plicately ribbed. Its color is whitish or yellowish brown, with conspicuous narrow brown revolving lines.

Distribution
This species occurs in the Mediterranean Sea off Apulia, Italy, and off Malta, Greece and Turkey; in the Atlantic Ocean off the Canary Islands.

References

 Deshayes, G. P., 1832–1835, Mollusques, dans : Expédition scientifique en Morée, entreprise et publiée par ordre du gouvernement francais - Travaux de la section des sciences physiques sous le direction de M. le Colonnel Bory de Saint Vincent. Ouvrage dédié au Roi. Levrault, P. Bertrand. , p. 81–203, pls 18–24
 Gofas, S.; Le Renard, J.; Bouchet, P. (2001). Mollusca, in: Costello, M.J. et al. (Ed.) (2001). European register of marine species: a check-list of the marine species in Europe and a bibliography of guides to their identification. Collection Patrimoines Naturels, 50: pp. 180–213

External links
   Tucker, J.K. 2004 Catalog of recent and fossil turrids (Mollusca: Gastropoda). Zootaxa 682:1–1295.
 
 Syntype at MNHN, Paris

taeniata
Gastropods described in 1835